The 1932–33 season was Cardiff City F.C.'s 14th season in the Football League. They competed in the 22-team Division Three South, then the third tier of English football, finishing 19th.

Season review

Football League Third Division South

Partial league table

Results by round

Players
First team squad.

Fixtures and results

Third Division South

FA Cup

Welsh Cup

Source

References

Bibliography

Cardiff City F.C. seasons
Association football clubs 1932–33 season
Card